The Luduș massacre occurred in the village of Luduș, in the Kingdom of Romania. Between 5 and 13 September 1944, on the outskirts of the village, the Royal Hungarian Army occupied the village and, with the help of natives, shot 15 Jews and 2 Romanians: Mihai Polac, Vilma Polac and their daughters Rozalia and Maria, Iosif Gluck and his daughter Rozalia, Mauriciu Fred, Ghizela Fred, Maria Kopstein, Adelca Izrael and the Haller sisters (Sarolta, Fani and Rozalia). The latter five were raped and subsequently murdered in the Haller sisters' home.

Following the recovery of the village, an investigation was started to find the culprits of the massacre. Investigations took place from 1945 to 1946. The Hungarian soldiers were never identified, but two natives, Bela Szabó and Elisabeta Bartha, were found guilty by the Romanian People's Tribunal in Cluj.

See also 
 List of massacres in Romania
 Sărmașu massacre
 Treznea massacre
 Ip massacre

References

External links

World War II massacres
Massacres in 1944
September 1944 events
20th century in Transylvania
Romania in World War II
Massacres in Romania
Military history of Hungary
Mass murder in 1944
1944 murders in Romania
The Holocaust in Romania
Hungary–Romania relations
Ethnic cleansing in Europe